The Brock Citizen is a weekly, community newspaper in Cannington, Ontario, Canada, that was established in 1996 combining the Beaverton Express, the Cannington Gleamer and Sunderland Sun newspapers. It is one of three newspapers in the Kawartha Division of Metroland Media Group, a subsidiary of Torstar which publishes newspapers across Ontario.

The Brock Citizen has a circulation reaching 5,600 homes. The current publisher is Dana Robbins, and the editor-in-chief is Marcus Tully.

The Citizen prides itself in being 'The Voice of Brock Township', serving Beaverton, Cannington and Sunderland and surrounding area. While the paper is delivered on Thursdays, any breaking news is posted any day on MyKawartha.com

Old issues of the Brock Citizen ranging from 1996 to 2000 are available at the Cannington Public Library. Some issues are available on microfilm as well.

Sales managers
 Mary Babcock - general manager and advertising director

See also
List of newspapers in Canada

References

External links
My Kawartha

Torstar publications
Mass media in the Regional Municipality of Durham
Weekly newspapers published in Ontario
Newspapers established in 1996
1996 establishments in Ontario